September 2019 Kabul bombings may refer to:

2 and 5 September 2019 Kabul bombings
17 September 2019 Afghanistan bombings, one of which occurred in Kabul